Funeral Song may refer to:

Funeral Song (Stravinsky) Op.5, written in 1908 in memorial of the death of his teacher Nikolai Rimsky- Korsakov
"Funeral Song" (The Rasmus song) 2003
"Funeral Song", single by Fast Romantics
"Funeral Song (Solomon Islands 1978)", Traditional composition used on Bastards (Björk album), taken from the album Spirit of Melanesia
"Funeral Song", by the American rock band Sleater-Kinney from the album One Beat
"Parachutes (Funeral Song)", by American indie pop duo Mates of State from the album Team Boo

See also
Chant funèbre (disambiguation)